Cristian Robert Pulhac (born 17 August 1984) is a Romanian former footballer who played as a left back.

Club career
Cristian Pulhac started his career at Dinamo București, making his Divizia A debut on 23 March 2002 in a 3–0 away victory against UM Timișoara. In the following two seasons, Pulhac was loaned by Dinamo at Poiana Câmpina and Sportul Studențesc. He played 32 games in the 2006–07 season under coach Mircea Rednic, helping Dinamo win the 18th title in the club's history, also appearing in 12 matches in which he scored one goal as the club reached the 2006–07 UEFA Cup sixteenths-finals where they were eliminated with 3–1 on aggregate by Benfica. In August 2010, Primera División club, Hércules signed Pulhac on a season-long loan with an option to buy him permanently, but he returned to Dinamo after only one season, as the Spanish club didn't trigger the buy-option. In January 2013 Pulhac terminated his contract with Dinamo after receiving an offer from Azerbaijan Premier League side Gabala, for whom he went on to sign a two-year contract with. Shortly after the appointment of Yuri Semin as manager of Gabala, Pulhac was deemed surplus to requirements and told he can leave the club on 8 July 2013. In January 2014, Pulhac was still with Gabala and training with the youth team as he refused to leave the club. Pulhac's contract with Gabala was finally terminated in August 2014. In December 2014, he signed a contract for 18 months with the Ekstraklasa side Zawisza Bydgoszcz. He returned to Romania in 2015, to play in the first league for Petrolul Ploiești, retiring in 2017 at Academica Clinceni in the second league.

International career
Pulhac won six caps for Romania's U21 team, scoring one goal.
Pulhac played three friendly games for Romania making his debut under coach Victor Pițurcă on 26 May 2006 against Northern Ireland in a 2–0 friendly win at Soldier Field in Chicago, playing 88 minutes. In 2007 he played in a 2–0 victory against Moldova and on 20 August 2008 he made his last appearance for the national team in a 1–0 victory against Latvia.

Career statistics

Honours
Dinamo București
Liga I: 2001–02, 2006–07
Cupa României: 2004–05, 2011–12
Supercupa României: 2005, 2012

References

External links

1984 births
Living people
Sportspeople from Iași
Romanian footballers
Association football defenders
FC Dinamo București players
FC Sportul Studențesc București players
FCM Câmpina players
Hércules CF players
Gabala FC players
Zawisza Bydgoszcz players
FC Petrolul Ploiești players
Aris Limassol FC players
LPS HD Clinceni players
Liga I players
Liga II players
La Liga players
Ekstraklasa players
Cypriot First Division players
Romanian expatriate footballers
Expatriate footballers in Spain
Expatriate footballers in Azerbaijan
Expatriate footballers in Poland
Expatriate footballers in Cyprus
Romania international footballers
Romanian expatriate sportspeople in Spain